Qeshlaq-e Hajjilar (also Romanized as Qeshlāq-e Ḩājjīlār) is a village in Arzil Rural District, Kharvana District, Varzaqan County, East Azerbaijan Province, Iran. At the 2006 census, its population was 27, in 7 families.

References 

Towns and villages in Varzaqan County